Percival Clarence Millar  (15 June 1925 – 28 November 2017) was an Australian politician. He was a member of the National Party and served in the House of Representatives from 1974 to 1990, representing the Queensland seat of Wide Bay. Prior to entering politics he was a public servant, soldier and farmer.

Early life
Millar was born on 15 June 1925 in Norwood, South Australia, the son of Elsie (née Klaebe) and Percival John Turbill. His father, a clerk, salesman and tram driver, died of tuberculosis in 1935. His mother subsequently married William Donald Millar and he was given his stepfather's surname.

As a child, Millar's family "followed an itinerant life across Victoria and Tasmania" in the aftermath of the Great Depression. He left school at the age of thirteen, by which time the family had settled in Hobart. As a teenager he worked as an assayist at the Rosebery zinc mines and as a salesman in a Hobart department store, before joining the Postmaster-General's Department in 1940. He worked for the department as a messenger boy, post office assistant, and junior assistant telgraphist.

Military service
Millar enlisted in the Royal Australian Air Force (RAAF) in 1943, at the age of 18. He joined the Central Bureau as a radio operator conducting signals intelligence. He was initially stationed in Brisbane and later in the Northern Territory, where he intercepted the Japanese message of surrender in 1945. He was discharged from the RAAF in 1946 with the rank of leading aircraftman.

Politics
Millar served in the military between 1943 and 1946 before becoming a public servant, and then a farmer. In 1974, he was elected to the Australian House of Representatives as the Country Party member for Wide Bay in Queensland. He served as chairman of committees from 1978 to 1983.

He retired in 1990. Together with Labor's Tom Uren, Millar was the last World War II combat veteran to serve in the House, though Russ Gorman who was a non-combat WWII veteran would serve until 1996. He was the father of ABC journalist Lisa Millar.

References

1925 births
2017 deaths
National Party of Australia members of the Parliament of Australia
Members of the Australian House of Representatives for Wide Bay
Members of the Australian House of Representatives
Members of the Order of Australia
Royal Australian Air Force personnel of World War II
20th-century Australian politicians